Francona is an Italian surname.  Notable people with the surname include:

Rick Francona (born 1951), American author, commentator, media military analyst and retired U.S. Air Force officer, cousin of Terry Francona
Terry Francona (born 1959), American Major League Baseball manager
Tito Francona (1933-2018), American Major League Baseball player, father of Terry Francona

Italian-language surnames